John Farquharson "Jack" Ferguson (12 April 1922 – 15 December 1993) was an Australian water polo player who competed in the 1948 Summer Olympics along with his brother Leon Ferguson.

At the Olympics he met his future wife, athlete June Maston.

References

External links
 
 

1922 births
1993 deaths
Australian male water polo players
Olympic water polo players of Australia
Water polo players at the 1948 Summer Olympics
Water polo players from Sydney
Sportsmen from New South Wales